The 1936 United States presidential election in Massachusetts took place on November 3, 1936, as part of the 1936 United States presidential election, which was held throughout all contemporary 48 states. Voters chose 17 representatives, or electors to the Electoral College, who voted for president and vice president.

Massachusetts voted for the Democratic nominee, incumbent President Franklin D. Roosevelt of New York, over the Republican nominee, Governor Alf Landon of Kansas. Roosevelt ran with incumbent Vice President John Nance Garner of Texas, while Landon’s running mate was newspaper publisher Frank Knox of Illinois. Also running that year was William Lemke of the short-lived Union Party, and his running mate Thomas C. O'Brien.

Roosevelt carried the state with 51.22% of the vote to Landon’s 41.76%, a Democratic victory margin of 9.46%. Lemke came in third, with 6.45%, while in a distant fourth was Socialist Norman Thomas with only 0.28%. Massachusetts weighed in as about 14.8% more Republican than the nation.

In the Jacksonian era, Massachusetts had been a typically Whig state, and after the founding of the Republican Party, it transitioned to being a bastion of Yankee Republicanism. In 1928, with Al Smith heading the Democratic ticket, a coalition of Irish Catholic and other ethnic immigrant voters primarily based in urban areas flipped Massachusetts and neighboring Rhode Island Democratic for the first time since before the Civil War (or, in Massachusetts' case, ever), leaving aside Wilson's low plurality wins in these states in the three-way race of 1912. 

However, Massachusetts trended hard towards Hoover in 1932, giving Roosevelt only a four point win despite having voted for Smith four years earlier, displaying something of a 'snapback' to its traditional New England Republican roots. As Roosevelt was re-elected nationally in a massive landslide, Massachusetts remained well to the right of the nation overall. Whereas pre-New Deal Republicans from south and west of the Hudson showed very little loyalty to their old party following the Depression, in New England, Republicans became galvanized to slow FDR’s expansion of the public sector.

A contributing factor to Roosevelt’s relative weakness in Massachusetts was the strong showing of William Lemke in the state. Lemke and his Union Party ran on a populist platform that appealed to many working class voters who might otherwise have been natural members of Roosevelt’s New Deal coalition. While Lemke finished with only 1.95 percent nationally, in Massachusetts, Lemke received 6.45 percent of the vote, making Massachusetts his third strongest state in the nation. Lemke fared particularly well in poor Catholic precincts of Massachusetts and Rhode Island, where he even outpolled Landon in all Irish neighbourhoods save Brighton. In the poorest Irish neighbourhoods, Lemke reached over 16 percent of the vote; in contrast he received less than his national average in Boston’s richest precincts.

Roosevelt and Landon would split the state’s 14 counties, winning 7 counties each. Roosevelt and Landon both did well in some of the Bay State's population centers, with Roosevelt carrying Suffolk, Worcester, and Hampden Counties (home to Boston, Worcester, and Springfield, respectively), and Landon carrying the suburban counties of Middlesex and Norfolk. As of 2021, this was the last time that the former towns of Dana, Enfield, Greenwich, and Prescott voted Republican, as well as the last election they participated in, as these staunchly Republican towns ceased to exist in 1938 when they were flooded to construct the Quabbin Reservoir.

Results

Results by county

See also
 United States presidential elections in Massachusetts

References

Massachusetts
1936
1936 Massachusetts elections